The flag of Tuva, a republic in the Russian Federation, is a light blue field with a white-fimbriated pall of the same color bordering a yellow triangle on the hoist.

White symbolizes silver and virtue; additionally, it is common in Tuva for hostesses to greet guests with silver streamers in their arms.  The golden yellow triangle symbolizes gold and Buddhism.  Blue symbolizes the morals of nomadic herdsmen (who are commonly respected in the region), as well the Tuvan sky.  The blue pall symbolizes the confluence of the Bii-Khem (Bolshoy Yenisei) and Kaa-Khem (Maly Yenisei) rivers at the Tuvan capital of Qızıl, where they form the Yenisei River, known to locals as the Ulug-Khem River.

The flag was created on September 18, 1992, by Oyun-ool Sat, I. C. Salchak and O. I. Lazarev. The proportions are 2:3.

Historical flags

Colour scheme

See also
 Flag of Mongolia
 Flag of Buryatia
 Flag of Kalmykia
 Flag of Agin-Buryat Okrug
 Flag of Ust-Orda Buryat Okrug
 Flag of Vanuatu (adopted 1980), which the flag of Tuva closely resembles.
 Flag of South Africa (adopted 1994), which the flag of Tuva also closely resembles.

References

Flags of the World

Flag
Flag
Flags of the federal subjects of Russia
Flags introduced in 1992
Tuva